Eva Luise Köhler (born 2 January 1947, in Ludwigsburg as Eva Luise Bohnet) is the wife of the former German President Horst Köhler and as such, was sometimes referred to by the media as the "First Lady" during her husband's presidency.

Education and career
She completed her Abitur in Ludwigsburg in 1966, and studied History, Germanistics and Religion. She then became a teacher of German. Eva Köhler was a member of the Social Democratic Party from 1972 to 1990 as she advocated Willy Brandt's Ostpolitik and participated in local politics. She left the SPD because she disliked the politics of Oskar Lafontaine.

Personal life
Eva and Horst Köhler have two children, Ulrike (born 1972) and Jochen (born 1977).

Honours

Foreign honours 
 : Knight Grand Cross of the Order of Merit of the Italian Republic (21 March 2006)
  : Grand Cross of the Order of Vytautas the Great (19 October 2005) 
  : Grand Cross of the Order of the Crown (2007)

References

1947 births
Living people
20th-century German educators
Spouses of presidents of Germany

Recipients of the Order of Merit of Baden-Württemberg
Grand Crosses of the Order of the Crown (Netherlands)
Grand Crosses of the Order of Vytautas the Great
Language teachers
Horst Köhler